Al Haj Eng Economist Mohammad Hashem Taufiqui (الحاج محمد هاشم توفیقی) (June 6, 1942 – June 6, 2021, Kabul) was one of the candidates in the presidential election of 2009 in Afghanistan.
Mohammad Hashem Taufiqui was an economist who  fulfilled different posts in the previous states of Afghanistan. He was an admirer of Mohammed Daoud Khan, the first president of the republic of Afghanistan. His goal was to use Khan's industrial models to develop the industry in Afghanistan. Taufiqui has also had an important role in the drawing of these models during the presidency of Mohammed Daud Khan.
Under Mohammad Hashim Taufiqui's leadership, agricultural production increased from 20 thousand tons to 160 thousand tons.

Biography 
Mohammad Hashem Taufiqui was the son of Mohammad Akbar Khan, son of Mohammad Ali Khan, son of Sardar Sultan Mohammad Khane Telayee and the son of Sardar Payenda Khan.

After graduating from Lese Habibya he joined the Faculty of Science in Kabul for one year. He then continued to his studies abroad in Germany and the United Kingdom for 11 years. There he learned mechanical engineering, industrial chemistry, management and political economy.

Taufiq was a candidate in the 2009 Afghan presidential elections.
Preliminary results place him 19th in a field of 38.

Administrative and ministerial works 
 General Head of Nasaji Dawlati, Nasaji Bagrami, Nasaji Balkh
 General Head of Sanaye (Industry)
 Assistant of Ministry of Mine and Industry

Achievements 
 Activating the great loom factory of Gulbahaar
 Launching the loom of Bagrami
 Launching the Carpentery of Kunarhaa
 Reactivating the woolweaving of Polecharkhi
 Reactivating the Chinisaazi Shaaker
 Reactivating they bicycle production company
 Reactivating the glass production company
 Launching the loom and cement of Herat
 Launching the loom and woolweaving of Kandahaar

Activities during Taliban 
 Launching and reactivating of different looms in Kandahaar, Balkh and Pole khomri.

Writings 
 Economic development of Afghanistan (Dari: enkeshafe eqtesaadi Afghanistan)
 A brief look at the industrial development of Afghanistan (Dari: yak negahe mokhtasar ba enkeshafe sanati Afghanistan)

Goals 

 Providing individual and national liberty and freedom for all the people of Afghanistan
 Providing 24/7 electricity
 Providing drinkwater for all the people of Afghanistan
 Providing water for agricultural regions
 Providing work and residence for all Afghans
 Focusing on using the plans of Mohammed Daoud Khan.

References

External links
Unisco

Afghan politicians
People from Kabul
Living people
1942 births